The following is a list of compositions dedicated to Mstislav Rostropovich. Throughout Rostropovich's lifetime, over 100 works have been written for him, many of which are now deeply rooted within the cello repertoire.

Cello Concerto No. 1 (Shostakovich)
Cello Concerto No. 2 (Shostakovich)
Cello Concerto (Lutosławski)
Cello suites (Britten)
Cello Symphony (Britten)
Symphony-Concerto (Prokofiev)
Slava! A Political Overture (Bernstein)
Tout un monde lointain (Dutilleux)
The Canticle of the Sun (Gubaidulina)

References

Lists of musical works
Music dedicated to ensembles or performers